The 2000–01 Divizia B was the 61st season of the second tier of the Romanian football league system.

The format has been maintained to two series, each of them having 18 teams. At the end of the season, the winners of the series promoted to Divizia A and the last six places from both series relegated to Divizia C. Two more teams relegated this season due to the reduction of team in the next season, from 36 (2x18) to 32 (2x16). A promotion play-off was played between the 13th and 14th-placed in the Divizia A and the runners-up of the Divizia B series.

Team changes

To Divizia B
Promoted from Divizia C
 Apemin Borsec
 Hondor Agigea**
 Fulgerul Bragadiru
 Cetate Deva
 Pandurii Târgu Jiu
 Baia Mare

Relegated from Divizia A
 Farul Constanța
 FC Onești
 CSM Reșița
 Extensiv Craiova

From Divizia B
Relegated to Divizia C
 Dacia Pitești
 Petrolul Moinești
 Dunărea Galați
 Chimica Târnăveni
 Chindia Târgoviște
 Universitatea Cluj
 Gloria Buzău
 Minerul Motru

Promoted to Divizia A
 Foresta Suceava
 Gaz Metan Mediaș

Note (**)
Hondor Agigea promoted but due to financial problems sell its place to Metalul Plopeni.

Renamed teams
Poiana Câmpina was renamed as Dinamo Poiana Câmpina and started to be the second squad of Dinamo București.

Electro-Bere Craiova was renamed as Electro Craiova.

Flacăra Râmnicu Vâlcea was renamed as FCM Râmnicu Valcea.

League map

League tables

Seria I

Seria II

Divizia A play-off
The 13th and 14th-placed teams of the Divizia A faced the 2nd-placed teams of the Divizia B.

|}
Note: FC Baia Mare sold their 2001–02 Divizia A place to FCM Bacău.

Top scorers 
12 goals
  Ionuț Mazilu (Sportul Studențesc)

11 goals
  Alexandru Bălțoi (Poiana Câmpina)

9 goals
  Cristian Ciubotariu (Sportul Studențesc)
  Cristian Dicu (Midia Năvodari)

8 goals

  Florin Bratu (Tractorul Brașov)
  Dorel Zaharia (Callatis Mangalia)
  Virgil Marșavela (Metrom Brașov)
  Mircea Oprea (Fulgerul Bragadiru)

7 goals
  Romulus Miclea (ASA Târgu Mureș)

See also 

2000–01 Divizia A

References 

Liga II seasons
Rom
2000–01 in Romanian football